Mocquard's dwarf gecko (Lygodactylus verticillatus) is a species of gecko endemic to Madagascar and Europa Island.

References

Lygodactylus
Reptiles of Madagascar
Endemic fauna of Madagascar
Reptiles described in 1895
Taxa named by François Mocquard